is a metro station located in Kita ward, Sakai, Osaka Prefecture, Japan, operated by the Osaka Metro. It has the station number "M29".

Lines

Layout
The station consists of one underground island platform.

Platforms

History
Kitahanada Station opened on April 18, 1987.

The facilities of the Midosuji Line were inherited by Osaka Metro after the privatization of the Osaka Municipal Transportation Bureau on 1 April 2018.

Passenger statistics
In fiscal 2020, the station was used by an average of 22,864 passengers daily.

Surrounding area
 eon Sakai Kitahanada store
 Sakai City Gokasho Higashi Elementary School
 Sakai City Gokasho Elementary School
 Sakai City Shin-Asakayama Elementary School

See also
 List of railway stations in Japan

References

External links

  

Osaka Metro stations
Railway stations in Japan opened in 1987
Railway stations in Osaka Prefecture
Sakai, Osaka